The Baymed Cup was a knockout cup competition for South Africa's 2nd-level football (soccer) clubs sponsored by Baymed Medical Scheme. The competition was to be played from August to October of each year and to include the 16 teams that make up the Mvela Golden League. The prize money for the winner was R1-million.

It was only ever played once.

First round

Quarter finals

Semi finals

Final

External links
Baymed Cup at rsssf.com

Baymed Cup
Baymed Cup, 2006